Admiral Jayant Ganpat "Podgy" Nadkarni,  PVSM, AVSM, NM, VSM, ADC (5 December 1931 – 2 July 2018) was an Indian Navy Admiral who served as the 13th Chief of the Naval Staff of the Indian Navy from 1 December 1987 to 30 November 1990.

Early life and education
Nadkarni was born on 5 December 1931.

He was a graduate of the Defence Services Staff College, Wellington and the Naval War College.

Naval career
Nadkarni completed training at TS Dufferin and joined the Royal Indian Navy in March 1949. He received his basic training at Royal Naval College, Dartmouth, on the training cruiser  and at other establishments of the Royal Navy. He specialized in navigation and direction. Commissioned on 1 September 1951, he was confirmed as a sub-lieutenant on 16 May 1953.

Promoted to lieutenant-commander on 16 May 1961, Nadkarni was the Navigating Officer of Cruiser INS Delhi during Liberation of Goa operations. He was promoted to captain on 30 June 1973. His service ashore included Chief Instructor (Navy) at Defence Services Staff College, Wellington and Chief Instructor Navy at the National Defence College.

Flag rank
As a Rear Admiral, he was appointed the Flag Officer Commanding Western Fleet (FOCWF) on 30 May 1981. He subsequently was promoted to the rank of Vice Admiral and appointed Chief of Personnel at Naval Headquarters (NHQ). He also served as the Flag Officer Commanding-in-Chief (FOC-IN-C), Eastern Naval Command before being appointed the Vice Chief of the Naval Staff (VCNS). On 1 December 1987, he took command as the 14th Chief of the Naval Staff (CNS) until his retirement on 30 November 1990.

Awards and decorations
Nadkarni was a recipient of the Param Vishisht Seva Medal, Ati Vishisht Seva Medal, Nausena Medal and the Vishisht Seva Medal for his distinguished service.

Personal life and death
Nadkarni married Vimal Divekar in 1956. The couple had two sons, one of whom is the retired Rear Admiral Ravindra Jayant Nadkarni.
Nadkarni died on 2 July 2018 at INHS Asvini, aged 86.

References

1931 births
2018 deaths
Chiefs of the Naval Staff (India)
Vice Chiefs of Naval Staff (India)
Flag Officers Commanding Western Fleet
Indian Navy admirals
Recipients of the Param Vishisht Seva Medal
Chiefs of Personnel (India)
Naval War College alumni
Recipients of the Ati Vishisht Seva Medal
Recipients of the Nau Sena Medal
Recipients of the Vishisht Seva Medal
Academic staff of the National Defence College, India
Defence Services Staff College alumni
Academic staff of the Defence Services Staff College